Charlotte Mount Brock Schreiber  (21 May 1834 – 3 July 1922) was an English-Canadian painter and illustrator, among the first of Canada's notable female painters.

Early life
Schreiber, née Morrell, was born in Essex, England. Before marrying and emigrating to Canada in 1875, she studied and found success in her native country. At Mr. Carey's School of Art in London, she trained with John Rogers Herbert, R.A., who specialized in historical paintings and portraits. She also studied anatomy and acquired a great understanding and appreciation for the human form: she wrote in 1895, "The human hand, the finger nail, the foot, every portion of the living body, the parts of a flower, are divinely beautiful … it is a joy to paint them as they are in reality". Equipped with this training, Schreiber achieved professional success early in her career, exhibiting at the Royal Academy at the age of 21 and receiving commissions to illustrate several books. In 1875, she married her cousin Weymouth Schreiber and moved to Canada with him and his three children, settling in Toronto.

Toronto
Schreiber quickly got involved in the Toronto art scene. In 1876, a year after she emigrated, she was elected to the Ontario Society of Artists, and the following year, she became the first woman to teach at the Ontario School of Art, today's OCAD University, where she was also the only woman to serve on the school's council. She also played a role as a founding member of the Women's Art Association of Canada.

In 1880, Schreiber became the first woman elected to the Royal Canadian Academy of Arts, which had been strictly and exclusively male until then. However, despite this great achievement, she was not permitted to attend meetings or engage in policy-making, and she remained the only woman on the academy until 1933 (53 years later), when the second woman, Marion Long, was elected. The National Gallery of Canada holds the painting that she submitted toward her Academy diploma. Titled The Croppy Boy (The Confession of an Irish Patriot), it is based on the Irish ballad "The Croppy Boy", which was popular during the Irish rebellion of the 1790s. It tells the story of a youth who stops in a church to confess his sins as he prepares for the battle of Wexford. His audience, however, is not a Catholic priest, but a disguised British soldier who arrests him and takes him for execution. The painting shows the youth on his knees, earnestly addressing the cloaked soldier, whose uniform is visible to the viewer but not to the penitent. The two figures are united by the red in their clothing, but the soldier occupies the shadowy portion of the canvas, with the youth on the lighter side, perhaps suggesting Schreiber's sympathies.

Work
Schreiber's contributions to Canadian art are immense. She painted scenes of everyday life, and she based her paintings on the things she saw and the people she knew personally. For instance, her 1876 painting Don`t Be Afraid (previously titled Springfield on the Credit) is based on close observation of children playing in the snow on the banks of the Credit River. Because of her insistence and commitment to realism, Schreiber is credited with introducing the realist style to Canada. Further, her experience in England allowed her to carry over European stylistic changes in art to Canada, leading directly to the country's artistic maturity. Schreiber's work epitomized the realist movement through the influence of both neoclassicism and romanticism. This can be seen in her Portrait of Edith Quinn, showcasing the naturalism portrayed in contemporary literature while maintaining a detailed, realistic portrayal of the subject.

Her art was influenced by literature, including her early illustrations of poems by Chaucer (The Legende of the Knight of the Red Crosse), Edmund Spenser (The Faerie Queene, illustrated 1871), and Elizabeth Barrett Browning (The Rhyme of the Duchess May, 1874).

Later years
After a long and successful career in Canada, Schreiber moved back to England in 1898 after the death of her husband, and she died in Paignton, South Devon, England in 1922.

Record sale prices
At the Cowley Abbott Auction, Important Canadian Art (Sale 2) December 1, 2022, lot #131, Edith Schreiber with her Sleigh, oil on board, 12.25 x 9.25 ins ( 31.1 x 23.5 cms ), Auction Estimate: $10,000.00 - $15,000.00, realized a price $138,000.00.

References

External links 
 Schreiber gallery at the National Gallery of Canada
 Canadian Women Artists History Initiative includes an extensive bibliography

1834 births
1922 deaths
Canadian illustrators
Canadian women painters
People from Essex
19th-century Canadian painters
20th-century Canadian painters
19th-century Canadian women artists
20th-century Canadian women artists
English emigrants to Canada
Members of the Royal Canadian Academy of Arts